Padawan may refer to:

Padawan, Sarawak, Malaysia
Padawan municipality, Malaysia
Padawan (Star Wars), an apprentice of the fictional Jedi Order in the Star Wars franchise